Helen David is an English fashion designer and artist based in London, England.

Early life and education
Helen David was born in Brighton, East Sussex, and moved to London shortly after completing her A-levels. She gained a first-class honors degree at Camberwell College of Arts, where she studied textiles and fine art print-making. She studied fashion as a post-graduate at Central Saint Martins College of Art and Design. During this time, became involved with the London Underground culture of the '80s and frequented places such as the Blitz Club, where the New Romantic styling that she is well known for was born.

Career

In 1983, David founded the design label English Eccentrics along with her sister, Judy Purbeck, and fellow designer, Claire Angel. The label specialized in hand-printed and hand-embroidered evening wear and scarves. She participated in the "London Goes to Tokyo" event organized by Susanne Bartsch, a show intended to broaden the reach of British designers. She also designed hosiery for Sophie Mirman's "Sock Shop", under the English Eccentrics name. 

In 2001 she took time away from the business to concentrate on art. "Friends and Icons" was her one-woman art exhibition, curated by Laura Parker-Bowles. David's fashion and textile work is part of permanent collections in the Victoria and Albert Museum, the Museum of London and the Art Institute of Chicago.

Books
 McDermott, Catherine & David, Helen, (1994), "English Eccentrics The Textile Designs of Helen Littman", Phaidon, 
 Ed. by Breward, Christopher and Wood, Ghislaine, (2012) "British Design from 1948: Innovation in the Modern Age", V and A books, 
 Marnie Fogg, (2009), "1980s Fashion Print", Batsford, 
 John Sorrell, (2009) "Creative Island 2", Laurence King Publishing Ltd, 
 Richard Martin, (1989), "Fashion and Surrealism", Thames and Hudson, 
 Ed. by Sonnet Stanfill, (2013), "From Club to Catwalk – 80's Fashion", V&A Publishing,

References

External links
 Helen David's website
 Judy Purbeck's website
 Claire Angel's website 
 Club to Catwalk at the V&A Museum, retrospective British Design work
 V&A Museum Christmas Tree Installation 2013 by Helen and Colin David
 Red Magazine – behind the scenes of the English Eccentrics' photo shoot, 2013
 English Eccentrics in World Wildlife Foundation Pandamonium, 2012
 English Eccentrics in V&A permanent collection
 English Eccentrics in V&A permanent collection
 English Eccentrics in Museum of London permanent collection
 English Eccentrics in Museum of London permanent collection
 English Eccentrics in Museum of London permanent collection
 English Eccentrics in Museum of London permanent collection
 English Eccentrics in The Art Institute of Chicago
 The Eleven Gallery

Year of birth missing (living people)
Living people
English fashion designers
British women fashion designers
People educated at Brighton and Hove High School